The Word, National Centre for the Written Word is a library and community centre in South Shields, England.

Location 
The building is located in South Shields market place, on the south bank of the River Tyne. It is near to the centre of town and also to the Shields Ferry landing. The Grade I listed Old Town Hall is adjacent, and St Hilda's Church is also nearby.

History 
The library was opened on 19 October 2016 and marked the completion of the first phase of the local authority South Tyneside Council's development plan "South Shields 365". It was designed by architects FaulknerBrowns. The main contractor was Bowmer + Kirkland.

The official opening ceremony was led by Councillor Alan Smith, the Mayor of South Tyneside who cut the ribbon. It opened to the public on 22 October 2016.

Amenities 
The building houses several amenities apart from being a public library:

 FabLab, creative area with 3D printer and laser cutting. This was funded by BT.
 StoryWorld, a room for story-telling.
 Computer games area
 Exhibition space, featuring different topics.

References 

Public libraries in Tyne and Wear
Buildings and structures in South Shields
2016 establishments in England
Libraries established in 2016